The IndieWire Critics Poll is an annual poll by IndieWire that recognizes the best in American and international films in a ranking of 10 films on 15 different categories. The winners are chosen by the votes of the critics from IndieWire and other invited critics from around the world. The poll began in 2006.

Categories
 Best Film
 Best Director
 Best Actor
 Best Actress
 Best Supporting Actor
 Best Supporting Actress
 Best Documentary
 Best Undistributed Film
 Best First Feature
 Best Screenplay
 Best Original Score/Soundtrack
 Best Cinematography
 Best Editing
 Best Overlooked Film
 Most Anticipated Film

Past winners

References 

American film awards